Melina may refer to:

Melina (name), including a list of people with the name
"Melina", a No.1 hit song by Camilo Sesto 1975
"Melina", a song by Tapani Kansa
 Melina, Dobretići, a village in Bosnia and Herzegovina
Malina (The Emperor's New School), a fictional character in The Emperor's New School
 An alternative spelling of Gmelina, a species of trees

See also
 Melena, a kind of feces
 Milina, a Serbian village
 Molena, Georgia 
 Malena (disambiguation)
 Malina (disambiguation)
 Malina (disambiguation)
 Molina (disambiguation)